And the Light Swallowed Everything is the third full-length studio album by Seirom, released on May 1, 2014 by Burning World Records.

Reception
José Carlos Santos of Terrorizer lauded the album, describing the music as "hauntingly, harrowingly, luminously beautiful." He concluded by saying, "Do you know when death or near-death experiences are sometimes portrayed in the movies from the perspective of the dying, when there’s a huge flash of white light that fills the whole screen? This album is a sort of sonic equivalent to a still frame of that exact moment."

Track listing

Personnel
Adapted from the And the Light Swallowed Everything liner notes.
 Maurice de Jong (as Mories) – vocals, instruments, recording, mixing, mastering, cover art
 Franscesca Marongiu – vocals (3)
 Aaron Martin – cello (6, 8)

Release history

References

External links 
 
 And the Light Swallowed Everything at Bandcamp

2014 albums
Seirom albums